Trollhøtta or Trollhetta is a mountain on the border of Trøndelag and Møre og Romsdal counties in Norway. It is part of the Trollheimen mountain range, just east of the lake Gråsjøen and the mountains Snota and Neådalssnota. To the south, across the valley Svartådalen, you see the mountains Geithetta and Svarthetta.

You can access all three peaks during the summer, but a sharp and steep ridge between the eastern and northern peak is problematic in the winter for access from the east. The Norwegian Mountain Touring Association has a cabin, Trollheimshytta, near the foot of the northern peak. In the east, there is the cabin Jøldalshytta.

References

Mountains of Møre og Romsdal
Mountains of Trøndelag
Surnadal
Rindal